Alexander Langer (22 February 1946 – 3 July 1995) was an Italian journalist, peace activist, politician, translator, and teacher.

Biography 
Born on 22 February 1946 in Sterzing, South Tyrol, a province of Italy inhabited by a German-speaking population, he became involved early on in local political issues, which at the time centered on the interethnic relations in the region, which after two world wars and decades of tensions and terrorism were very tense.

In the early 1970s he was active in Lotta Continua, a left-wing political organization in Italy. Later, he joined the Green Party of South Tyrol, and became a member of the regional council for Trentino-Alto Adige/Südtirol in 1978. Ever resistant to imposed ethnic boundaries, he refused twice to declare his ethnic group during the 1981 and 1991 census in Bolzano. (This is a mandatory choice in the province, to protect the ethnic status quo.) This choice made him ineligible to stand for local elections.

During the 1980s he rose in the ranks of the Green Party, first at the national level, and then in Europe, eventually becoming Member of the European Parliament and president of the Greens/EFA Group in the European Parliament in 1989.

He later became deeply involved in peace initiatives in Europe and the Middle East, and in fostering the dialog between the alternative left parties, the Radicals, left-wing Christians and other pro-peace, environmentalist and fringe political groups at European level. He served as representative of the European Parliament in Israel, Russia, Brazil, Argentina, Libya, Egypt, Cyprus, Malta, and was particularly involved in campaigning for peace in the former Yugoslavia, during the ethnic wars of the 1990s.

On June 26, 1995 Langer took part in the protests in Cannes against Europe's inertia in the face of the war in the Balkans and on the same day he wrote his latest article, also on Bosnia, entitled Europe dies or is reborn in Sarajevo. Shocked by the drama of the war, suffering from asthma and depression, on 3 July 1995 Langer committed suicide in Pian dei Giullari, near Florence, by hanging himself from an apricot tree; he left three notes to his family and friends, one of which was written in German to his friends, explaining the gesture and also quoting a sentence from the Gospel of Matthew.

Alexander Langer Award 

Beginning in 1997, the Alexander Langer Foundation has given an annual award to an activist in Langer's honor. As of 2012, the award carries a 10,000-euro honorarium.

See also
 List of peace activists

References

External links
Alexander Langer Foundation

1946 births
1995 deaths
1995 suicides
People from Sterzing
Germanophone Italian people
Italian anti-war activists
Italian ecologists
20th-century Italian journalists
Italian politicians who committed suicide
Suicides by hanging in Italy
Federation of the Greens MEPs
MEPs for Italy 1984–1989
MEPs for Italy 1989–1994
20th-century Italian translators
Italian political party founders